Beata Maria Bublewicz (born 26 February 1975 in Olsztyn) is a Polish politician.  She was elected to Sejm on 25 September 2005 getting 5,198 votes in 35 – Olsztyn for Civic Platform.

She is the daughter of late rally driver Marian Bublewicz.

See also
 Members of Polish Sejm 2005-2007

External links
 Beata Bublewicz - parliamentary page - includes declarations of interest, voting record, and transcripts of speeches.

Women members of the Sejm of the Republic of Poland
Civic Platform politicians
1975 births
Living people
People from Olsztyn
21st-century Polish women politicians
Members of the Polish Sejm 2005–2007
Members of the Polish Sejm 2007–2011
Members of the Polish Sejm 2011–2015
University of Warmia and Mazury in Olsztyn alumni